Anaïs Mitchell (born March 26, 1981) is an American singer-songwriter, musician, and playwright. Mitchell has released eight studio albums, including Hadestown (2010), Young Man in America (2012), Child Ballads (2013), and Anaïs Mitchell (2022).

She developed her album Hadestown into a stage musical (together with director Rachel Chavkin), which received its US debut at New York Theatre Workshop in summer 2016, and its Canadian debut at the Citadel Theatre, Edmonton the following year. The show opened at London's National Theatre in November 2018 and then on Broadway on April 17, 2019, at the Walter Kerr Theatre. The Broadway production of Hadestown won eight Tony Awards in 2019 including the Tony Award for Best Musical. Mitchell received the Tony Award for Best Original Score; she was also nominated for Best Book of a Musical. The Broadway cast album of the show took home the Grammy Award for Best Musical Theater Album in 2020. Mitchell's first book, Working on a Song: The Lyrics of Hadestown, was published by Plume Books on October 6, 2020. Mitchell was included in Times 100 Most Influential People of 2020.

Mitchell is a member of the band Bonny Light Horseman, whose self-titled debut was released in 2020. The band's second album, "Golden Rolling Holy", was released in 2022.

Early life
Mitchell's father is a novelist and college professor and named her after author Anaïs Nin. She grew up on Treleven farm in Addison County, Vermont. She was raised Quaker.  Her mother was Deputy Secretary of Vermont's Agency of Human Services. After traveling to the Middle East, Europe and Latin America as a child, she attended Middlebury College.

Career
Having begun writing her first songs at the age of 17, around 1998, Mitchell won the New Folk award in 2003, when she was 22, at the Kerrville Folk Festival. Her album Hymns for the Exiled was released on Chicago's Waterbug Records label in 2004. This recording attracted the attention of singer-songwriter Ani DiFranco, who signed her to the Righteous Babe Records label.

In 2006, Mitchell debuted a draft of her "folk opera" Hadestown, which she wrote in collaboration with arranger Michael Chorney and director Ben T. Matchstick. A revised version of Hadestown was staged in 2007.  Her third album, The Brightness, was released that same year on Righteous Babe Records.

Her album Hadestown, produced by Todd Sickafoose, was released in spring 2010 to favorable reviews. Described as "the story of Orpheus and Eurydice set in post-apocalyptic Depression-era America, the album includes guest appearances by Ani DiFranco, Greg Brown, Justin Vernon of Bon Iver, Ben Knox Miller of The Low Anthem, and The Haden Triplets (Petra, Rachel, and Tanya Haden).

Mitchell continued quietly working on a stage version of Hadestown while also writing and recording new material. In early 2012, she released Young Man in America on Wilderland Records. Mitchell opened the North American leg of Bon Iver's autumn 2012 tour, which included two sold-out shows at Radio City Music Hall. The album was largely praised by critics as "genre-defying" and her "second consecutive masterpiece."

In late 2012, Mitchell completed recording seven songs from the collection of Child Ballads, compiled by Francis James Child, with fellow musician Jefferson Hamer. The album, produced by Gary Paczosa, was released in February 2013, winning a BBC Radio 2 Folk Award for Best Traditional Song. This was followed in 2014 by xoa, for which Mitchell re-recorded a number of her older songs using only guitar and vocals. This stripped back album included some songs from Hadestown which were recorded for the first time in Mitchell's own voice, as well as three brand new songs.

In summer 2016, the newly expanded theatrical version of Hadestown opened at New York Theatre Workshop with Vogue magazine predicting that "Hadestown will be your next musical theatre obsession". The following year, it received its Canadian premiere at The Citadel Theatre, Edmonton, and in April 2018, London's National Theatre announced that it would present a three-month run during the winter ahead of the show's Broadway transfer. Hadestown opened on Broadway at the Walter Kerr Theatre on April 17, 2019.

In 2019, Mitchell was appearing as part of a three-piece "supergroup" called Bonny Light Horseman, consisting of herself, Eric D. Johnson of Fruit Bats and guitarist Josh Kaufman. The group's self-titled debut album was released on January 24, 2020.

In June 2021, American supergroup Big Red Machine announced their second studio album, How Long Do You Think It's Gonna Last?, which features Mitchell's guest vocals in three of its tracks: "Latter Days", "Phoenix", and "New Auburn".

Personal life
Mitchell married Noah Hahn in 2006. They have two daughters, Ramona and Rosetta.

Reception
Mitchell has received favorable reviews on her musical style, sound and performance. An article in Acoustic Guitar magazine calls Mitchell "fearlessly emotive" and compares her to Bob Dylan, Leonard Cohen, and Gillian Welch. The UK's Independent newspaper called her "the most engaging, and in some ways, most original artist currently working in the field of new American folk music" The New York Times noted that "Ms Mitchell's songs address contemporary angst with uncanny vision" and called her "a formidable songwriting talent".

Discography

Studio albums

EPs

Cast albums

Singles

As lead artist

As featured artist

Other appearances

Audiobooks
Working on a Song: The Lyrics of Hadestown (October 6, 2020; Penguin Audio)

Awards and nominations

References

External links 

 Official website
Guardian Feature
Vogue Interview
NPR All Songs Considered
The Independent Interview
Boston Globe Feature

Living people
1981 births
21st-century American composers
21st-century American guitarists
21st-century American women guitarists
21st-century American women singers
American dramatists and playwrights
American women composers
American women singer-songwriters
American folk singers
American folk guitarists
American musical theatre composers
American musical theatre librettists
American musical theatre lyricists
American people of British descent
American singer-songwriters
American women dramatists and playwrights
Broadway composers and lyricists
Feminist musicians
Grammy Award winners
Guitarists from Vermont
Middlebury College alumni
People from Addison County, Vermont
People from Montpelier, Vermont
Righteous Babe Records artists
Singers from Vermont
Songwriters from Vermont
Waterbug Records artists
21st-century women composers
21st-century American singers
Tony Award winners
Bonny Light Horseman (band) members